Rychard Martin, Mayor of Galway, fl. 1519-37.

Biography

Martin was related to Wylliam Martin, under whom he served as bailiff for the term 1519-20. He served the first of three terms as Mayor for 1526-27. In 1535 he was again Mayor, been re-elected the following years.

He gained note in local folklore for firing a cannon at the castle of Mutton Island at the conclusion of a long voyage, so overjoyed was he to see his home again. Subsequent generations of the Martyn family observed this custom.

See also

 The Tribes of Galway

References
History of Galway, James Hardiman, Galway, 1820.
Old Galway, Maureen Donovan O'Sullivan, 1942.
Henry, William (2002). Role of Honour: The Mayors of Galway City 1485-2001. Galway: Galway City Council.  
 Martyn, Adrian (2016). The Tribes of Galway: 1124-1642

16th-century Irish politicians
Irish businesspeople
Mayors of Galway